Yuttajak Kornchan (born May 31, 1982), simply known as Nhon, is a Thai professional footballer who plays as a defensive midfielder for Phrae United.

International career

Yuttajak was included in Thailand's 2004 AFF Championship squad.

International goals

Honours

Club
Hoàng Anh Gia Lai 
 V-League (1): 2004

Buriram United
 Thai Premier League (2): 2008, 2011
 Thai FA Cup (1): 2011
 Thai League Cup (1): 2011

International 
Thailand U-23
 Southeast Asian Games Gold Medal (1): 2005

External links

1982 births
Living people
Yuttajak Kornchan
Yuttajak Kornchan
Association football midfielders
Association football defenders
Hoang Anh Gia Lai FC players
An Giang FC players
Yuttajak Kornchan
Pelita Bandung Raya players
Yuttajak Kornchan
Yuttajak Kornchan
Yuttajak Kornchan
V.League 1 players
Yuttajak Kornchan
Liga 1 (Indonesia) players
Thai expatriate footballers
Thai expatriate sportspeople in Vietnam
Thai expatriate sportspeople in Indonesia
Expatriate footballers in Vietnam
Expatriate footballers in Indonesia
Yuttajak Kornchan
Yuttajak Kornchan
Southeast Asian Games medalists in football
Competitors at the 2005 Southeast Asian Games